Madhuraiyai Meetta Sundharapandiyan is a 1978 Indian Tamil-language historical action film, directed by M. G. Ramachandran, starring himself in the lead role, with M. N. Nambiar, P. S. Veerappa, Latha and Padmapriya. It was Ramachandran's final film as an actor. The film is based on the serial novel Kayalvizhi by Akilan. It was released on 14 January 1978 and became a box-office bomb, but Latha won the Tamil Nadu State Film Award for Best Actress.

Plot 

The story narrates the tale of a brave Pandiya prince named Sundharapandhiyan who redeems the kingdom from the hands of a Chola king. Under the identity of an itinerant poet, Paintamizh Kumaran, he is going to fire the consciousness of the people with his words and reunite them in his cause, which is the defence of freedom and rights. He unites the people and then engages in war with the emperor sending him reeling back and liberating Madurai reestablishing Pandiya empire.

Cast 
M. G. Ramachandran as Paintamizh Kumaran alias Sundharapandhiyan
Latha as Kayalvizhi
Padmapriya as Princess Bhamini
M. N. Nambiar as Prince Raja Rajan
P. S. Veerappa as The Minister Thaigum Valavarai
K. Kannan as The King Narasihma
S. V. Subbaiah as The King Chozhan
S. V. Sahasranamam as The King Kulasegara Pandiyan
Shanmugasundaram as Son of Minister
V. S. Raghavan as The Minister
Thengai Srinivasan  as Vilava, The Prince Sundharapandhiyan's spy
Isari Velan as Naghavana
Mustapha
Ennatha Kannaiya as Salabu
T. K. S. Natarajan as Iyer
Trichy Sounderarjan as Kingdom's doctor

Production 
Madhuraiyai Meetta Sundharapandiyan is based on the serial novel Kayalvizhi by Akilan. The film began production in 1974, with B. R. Panthulu as director and producer; however, following his death, M. G. Ramachandran took over directing while Sokkaiah and Subramani Iyer of Soleswar Combines took over production. It was Ramachandran's final film as an actor, after which he became a full-time politician. (When this film was released, Ramachandran was already Tamil Nadu's chief minister for months).

Soundtrack 
The soundtrack was composed by M. S. Viswanathan. The song "Amutha Thamizhil" is based on Dwijavanthi raga.

Release and reception 
Madhuraiyai Meetta Sundharapandiyan was released on 14 January 1978. The film became a box-office bomb, with many people attributing it to the poor timing of release. Latha won the Tamil Nadu State Film Award for Best Actress, creating a major upset as people expected either Sridevi (for 16 Vayathinile) or Lakshmi (for Sila Nerangalil Sila Manithargal) to win.

References

External links 

1970s Tamil-language films
1978 films
Films based on Indian novels
Films directed by M. G. Ramachandran
Films scored by M. S. Viswanathan
Films set in the Chola Empire
Films set in the Pandyan Empire
Indian historical action films